Rikukash (also Romanized as Rīkūkash) is a village in Bahu Kalat Rural District, Dashtiari District, Chabahar County, Sistan and Baluchestan Province, Iran. At the 2006 census, its population was 512, in 111 families.

References 

Populated places in Chabahar County